Tyng is a surname. Notable people with the surname include:

Anne Tyng (1920–2011), architect and professor
Charles Tyng (1801–1879), sea captain, merchant, and memoirist 
Christopher Tyng (born 1968), American composer
Jim Tyng (1856–1931), first baseball player to wear a catcher's mask
Stephen H. Tyng (1800–1885), evangelical Episcopal clergyman in New York City

See also
Ting (disambiguation)